Rafael Melgoza Radillo (born 14 July 1946) is a Mexican politician affiliated with the Party of the Democratic Revolution. As of 2014 he served as Senator of the LIX Legislature of the Mexican Congress representing Michoacán as replacement of Lázaro Cárdenas Batel and as Deputy of the LIV and LVIII Legislatures.

References

1946 births
Living people
People from Apatzingán
Politicians from Michoacán
Members of the Senate of the Republic (Mexico)
Members of the Chamber of Deputies (Mexico)
Party of the Democratic Revolution politicians
20th-century Mexican politicians
21st-century Mexican politicians
Members of the Congress of Michoacán
Municipal presidents in Michoacán